Annan Oru Koyil is a 1977 Indian Tamil-language drama film, directed by K. Vijayan and written by Vietnam Veedu Sundaram. The film stars Sivaji Ganesan, Sujatha, Suruli Rajan and Jai Ganesh. It become a blockbuster at the box-office, running for over 100 days in all over Tamil Nadu. The film was a remake of Kannada film Devara Kannu.

Plot 
Dr. Ramesh dotes on his sister Lakshmi who practically worships her brother. One time, Basker, her friend, tries to rape her and she kills him in the process of defending herself but going into a catatonic state. Fearing that his sister will have to face the law, he takes the blame on himself and starts to run from the law. He finds help in Janaki, his childhood lover while his colleague/junior Dr. Ananth takes it upon himself to get Lakshmi back from her current state. Will she recover and will the brother & sister reunite forms the rest of the story?

Cast 
Sivaji Ganesan as Dr. Ramesh
Sujatha as Janaki
Sumithra as Lakshmi
Jai Ganesh as Dr. Ananth
Mohan Babu as Baskar
Major Sundarrajan as Lawyer
S. V. Ramadas as Janaki's guardian uncle
V. R. Thilagam as Janaki's aunt
Thengai Srinivasan as Police Inspector
Suruli Rajan as Constable Ranga
A. Karunanidhi as Constable
Manorama as Jayamuniyamma
Premanand as Sankar
ISR as Selvam
Pushpamala as Police Inspector's wife
Veeraraghavan as Station Master

Production 
Ganesan's home, Annai Illam, features in the film.

Soundtrack 
The music was composed by M. S. Viswanathan, with lyrics by Kannadasan.

Reception 
Ananda Vikatan rated the film 53 out of 100, praising Ganesan's performance.

References

External links 
 

1970s Tamil-language films
1977 drama films
1977 films
Films directed by K. Vijayan
Films scored by M. S. Viswanathan
Indian drama films
Tamil remakes of Kannada films